Goszyn is a non-operational railway station in Goszyn (Pomeranian Voivodeship), Poland.

Lines crossing the station

References 
Goszyn article at Polish stations database , URL accessed at 17 March 2006

Railway stations in Pomeranian Voivodeship
Disused railway stations in Pomeranian Voivodeship
Gdańsk County